Princess Michael of Kent  (born Baroness Marie-Christine Anna Agnes Hedwig Ida von Reibnitz, 15 January 1945) is a member of the British royal family of German, Austrian, Czech and Hungarian descent. She is married to Prince Michael of Kent, who is a grandson of George V. Princess Michael of Kent was an interior designer before becoming an author; she has written several books on European royalty. She carries out lecture tours and supports her husband in his public duties.

Early life and ancestry
Princess Michael was born Baroness Marie-Christine Anna Agnes Hedwig Ida von Reibnitz, on 15 January 1945, in Karlsbad, a town then in German-populated Sudetenland, now known as Karlovy Vary in the Czech Republic.

The ancestral seat of the family was Reibnitz Castle. On her father's side, Princess Michael is a descendant of the Burggrafen von , Herrand III von  and Nostitz family, who are also ancestors of Queen Elizabeth II.

She is the younger daughter of Baron Günther Hubertus von Reibnitz (1894–1983) by his second wife, Countess Maria Anna Carolina Franziska Walburga Bernadette Szapáry von Muraszombath, Széchysziget und Szapár (1911–1988), who was the daughter of Count Friedrich Szapáry von Muraszombath, Széchysziget und Szapár, the Austro-Hungarian Ambassador to Saint Petersburg at the outbreak of World War I. 

Princess Michael was born at the family estates of her Austrian maternal grandmother, Princess Hedwig von Windisch-Graetz (1878–1918), shortly before the defeat of Nazi Germany and end of World War II in Europe. The expulsion of Germans resident in Czechoslovakia followed later that year.

Princess Michael's father was a Nazi party member and an SS Cavalry officer during World War II.  With the advance of the Soviet army near the end of the war, the family abandoned their estates and moved to American-occupied Bavaria. Her parents divorced in 1946 and, along with her mother and elder brother Baron Friedrich von Reibnitz (born 1942), Princess Michael moved to Australia, where she was educated at Convent of the Sacred Heart, Rose Bay (now Kincoppal-Rose Bay). In the early 1960s, she lived with her father on his farm in Mozambique. She then went from Vienna to London to study History of Fine and Decorative Art at the Victoria and Albert Museum.

Marriages
Her first husband was the English banker Thomas Troubridge (1939–2015), younger brother of Sir Peter Troubridge, 6th Baronet. They met at a boar hunt in Germany and were married on 14 September 1971 at Chelsea Old Church, London. The couple separated in 1973 and were civilly divorced in 1977. The marriage was ecclesiastically annulled by Pope Paul VI in May 1978.

One month after the annulment, on 30 June 1978, at a civil ceremony in Vienna, Austria, she married Prince Michael of Kent, the son of Prince George, Duke of Kent, and Princess Marina of Greece and Denmark. Prince Michael is a grandson of King George V. Marie-Christine has named Lord Mountbatten as their matchmaker.

Michael presented Marie-Christine with a two-stone sapphire-and-diamond ring made from stones that belonged to his mother, Princess Marina. For the ball held after the wedding, she wore the City of London diamond fringe tiara and a cream dress from Bellville Sassoon. Upon their marriage, she was accorded the style and title of Her Royal Highness Princess Michael of Kent, the female equivalent to her husband's title. After receiving Pope John Paul II's permission, the couple later received a blessing of their marriage in a Roman Catholic ceremony on 29 June 1983 at Archbishop's House, London.

Since the Act of Settlement 1701 prohibited anyone who married a Roman Catholic from succeeding to the throne, Prince Michael of Kent (at that time, 15th in the line of succession) lost his succession rights upon marrying Marie-Christine. Prince Michael was reinstated to the line of succession to the British throne on 26 March 2015 with the passing of the Succession to the Crown Act 2013. Their children are members of the Church of England and have retained their rights of succession since birth.

Prince and Princess Michael of Kent have two children:
Lord Frederick Windsor, born 6 April 1979 at St Mary's Hospital, London. He married Sophie Winkleman on 12 September 2009 and they have two daughters: Maud (born 15 August 2013) and Isabella (born 16 January 2016).
Lady Gabriella Kingston, born 23 April 1981 at St Mary's Hospital, London. She married Thomas Kingston on 18 May 2019.

Marie-Christine was linked romantically by the press to John Warner and tycoons Ward Hunt and Mikhail Kravchenko. She also had a friendship with John W. Galbreath and Peter de Savary, the latter of whom gifted her a £150,000 parcel of land on Antigua.

Career
Before her marriage to Prince Michael, she worked as an interior designer. According to a report in The Observers Pendennis column in September 2007, the Princess resumed decorating under her original company, Szapar Designs. In 1986, her first book Crowned in a Far Country: Portraits of Eight Royal Brides was published, after which she faced allegations of plagiarism and reached an out-of-court settlement with another author. Her second book Cupid and the King: Five Royal Paramours faced the same issues, which the Princess attributed to the researcher, who had allegedly submitted notes without due attribution. The book was to be published by Michael Joseph, but after the draft was submitted several months late, it was rejected and published by HarperCollins. From 2007 to 2011, the Princess served as president of Partridge Fine Art, a gallery in London's New Bond Street until it went into administration having suffered substantial multi-year losses. In 2008, the Princess was engaged as a consultant by Galerie Gmurzynska in Switzerland, and later became their international ambassador. She also served on the board of the Victoria and Albert Museum, and goes on lecture tours around the world where she talks about historical subjects at universities, museums and galleries to promote her books and endorse her charities. Marie-Christine, whose husband has a strong interest in Russia, was reportedly taking Russian lessons as of May 2012.

Books
 
 
 
 
 
 
 

Royal and charitable activities

Prince and Princess Michael represented the Queen at the Belize independence celebrations and at the coronation of King Mswati III of Eswatini. Prince Michael also supports a large number of charities and organisations, and Princess Michael supports him in his work.

Since she was a teenager, Princess Michael has held a long and enduring passion for the conservation of cheetahs and she is international royal patron for the Cheetah Conservation Fund in Namibia. She is a Fellow of the Linnean Society of London, a learned society dedicated to natural history and taxonomy.

Finances
Prince Michael has never received a parliamentary annuity or an allowance from the Privy Purse. The couple have had the use of a five-bedroom, five-reception grace and favour apartment at Kensington Palace. The Queen had paid the rent for the apartment at a market rate of £120,000 annually from her own private funds with the couple paying the nominal amount of £70 per week. The rent goes to the Grant-in-aid, provided by the Government for the maintenance of the Occupied Royal Palaces. The rent is based on the current rate for commercially rented properties at Kensington Palace, and is recorded in the overall figures for commercial rents in the Grant-in-aid annual report. This rent payment by the Queen is "in recognition of the Royal engagements and work for various charities which Prince and Princess Michael of Kent have undertaken at their own expense, and without any public funding", according to a statement released by the British Monarchy Media Centre.

In 2008, it was announced that it had been agreed that Prince and Princess Michael would pay rent of £120,000 a year from their own funds from 2010. Members of Parliament on the public accounts committee had demanded the change after the Kents' rent had come to light. The Kents have lived in the apartment since 1979, paying only their utility bills prior to 2002.

Catholicism
Princess Michael of Kent is a Roman Catholic, and attended several events during Pope Benedict XVI's state visit to the United Kingdom in September 2010. 

She attended Mass in Westminster Cathedral on Saturday, 18 September, where she was seated in the first row among other dignitaries, including Lord and Lady Nicholas Windsor, the Duke of Norfolk and former Prime Minister Tony Blair; the Pope gave them an audience after Mass. 

On the last day of the Pope's visit, 19 September, she attended the open-air Mass of beatification for Cardinal John Henry Newman at Cofton Park, Birmingham. Princess Michael was personally involved in the beatification process and attended several other celebrations relating to his beatification before and after the Cofton Park Mass, including a commemorative concert of the Dream of Gerontius at Birmingham Town Hall on 18 September. 

She also attended a civic dinner with invited dignitaries and bishops in Birmingham, before attending the Mass and meeting the Pope. Previously, in November 2008, the Princess attended the translation of remains of Cardinal Newman at Birmingham Oratory along with other guests of honour, including Francis Campbell, HM Ambassador to the Holy See; the Lord Mayor of Birmingham and Lady Mayoress; Sir Ivor Roberts, President of Trinity College, Oxford, and formerly British Ambassador to Italy; and Sir Derek Morris, Provost of Oriel College, Oxford. After the Translation Mass, Princess Michael was shown round Cardinal Newman's Room and Chapel and visited Newman's library.

Princess Michael of Kent represented the Duke of Edinburgh at the launching ceremony of the Green Pilgrimage Network in Assisi, Italy, on 1 November 2011. It was organised by the Alliance of Religions and Conservation (ARC), founded by the Duke of Edinburgh in 1995, in association with the World Wide Fund for Nature (WWF), of which Prince Philip was formerly President. The Princess spoke on behalf of the Duke of Edinburgh and led the opening procession.

Views and allegations of racism and speciesism
The Princess has a controversial history of statements and actions that have been widely viewed as racist.

The media claim she once declared to an American fashion magazine that she had "more royal blood in her veins than any person to marry into the royal family since Prince Philip". After being told about Princess Michael's lineage by Lord Mountbatten, Queen Elizabeth II reportedly joked that she was "a bit too grand for us".

In 2004, she was accused of racially insulting black diners at a restaurant in New York. A spokesperson acknowledged that the Princess had been angry at the group, who were seated on a table near her, but denied that she had told them to "go back to the colonies". In an interview with a newspaper she reflected on her encounter with "a group of rappers", which in fact included the TV reporter A. J. Calloway as well as a banker, a lawyer, and a music mogul.

In February 2005, she gave a series of interviews to promote her book, in one of which she said that Britons should be more concerned about the bloodlines of their children, and claimed that the British media were "excited" by Prince Harry's decision to wear a swastika for a fancy dress party because of the British press' "ownership structure". She claimed that "nobody would have got excited" had he worn the hammer and sickle.

In September 2005, she talked to Mazher Mahmood, a News of the World journalist posing as a fake sheikh and potential buyer for Nether Lypiatt Manor, Princess Michael and her husband's country home at the time. The Princess shared her opinions on Diana, Princess of Wales describing her as a "bitter" and "nasty" woman. She went on to say that Charles, Prince of Wales was "jealous" of his former wife's popularity, and that he had effectively married a "womb". She also added that the Prince's Duchy Originals jams were not homemade: "He's got factories. It's just got his name on it."

On hearing that research by Dorothy Cheney and Robert Seyfarth seemed to indicate that rank among female baboons is hereditary, the Princess is reported to have said: "I always knew that when people who aren't like us claim that hereditary rank is not part of human nature, they must be wrong. Now you've given me evolutionary proof!"

In January 2014, the Princess was interviewed by Conrad Black. She described the older generation of the royal family as "boring for most people". Princess Michael also said that she was "very fond of" Diana, Princess of Wales, but also stated that she had "little education", and both she and Sarah, Duchess of York, were abandoned by their mothers at a young age, which made it hard for them to deal with their status as royal figures.

In September 2015, the Princess was in the news for stating publicly that animals do not have rights because they do not pay taxes, have bank accounts or vote.

In December 2017, the Princess was criticised for wearing a blackamoor brooch with a stylised figure of an African man to a Christmas banquet at Buckingham Palace. Meghan Markle, later the Duchess of Sussex, a mixed-race American woman of African and European descent, and at the time the fiancée of Prince Harry, was present at the dinner. A spokesperson for the Princess later said that she "is very sorry and distressed that it has caused offence".

In April 2018, her daughter's former partner, Aatish Taseer, alleged that the Princess had owned a pair of black sheep that she named after Venus and Serena Williams.

Health
In 1985, Marie-Christine was hospitalised for one week to undergo treatments for "nervous exhaustion". In May 2021, it was reported that Princess Michael was suffering from blood clots after being diagnosed with COVID-19 six months earlier. She is known to have suffered from lung issues in her childhood.

Titles, styles, honours and arms
Titles and styles

Since her marriage to Prince Michael, Marie-Christine has been styled as Her Royal Highness Princess Michael of Kent. It just so happens that Prince Michael is the only male line grandson of King George V who is not a royal peer, hence the feminine style of Prince Michael of Kent was adopted.

Honours

  6 February 2012: Queen Elizabeth II Diamond Jubilee Medal

Foreign
 :  Dame Grand Cross of Honour and Devotion of the Sovereign Military Order of Malta (September 2010)
 : Dame of the Order of the Blessed Virgin Mary of Mercy
  House of Habsburg:  Dame of the Order of the Starry Cross
  House of Bourbon-Two Sicilies (Castroan branch):  Dame Grand Cross of Justice of the Two-Sicilian Sacred Military Constantinian Order of Saint George (GCJCO')

Other
 Honorary Freeman of the Worshipful Company of Gardeners
 Honorary Freeman of the Worshipful Company of Weavers
 Honorary Freeman of the Worshipful Company of Goldsmiths
 Fellow of the Linnean Society of London (FLS)

Arms

Issue

Ancestry

Notes

External links

 Princess Michael of Kent's official website
 Prince and Princess Michael of Kent at the Royal Family website
 HRH Princess Michael of Kent: Princess Michael's descent from Diane de Poitiers and Catherine de' Medici.
 Suites designed by Her Royal Highness Princess Michael of Kent at Hotel Baltschug Kempinski Moscow

1945 births
Living people
20th-century British writers
20th-century British women writers
21st-century British novelists
21st-century British women writers
Austrian baronesses
Austrian emigrants to the United Kingdom
Austrian Roman Catholics
Bohemian nobility
British non-fiction writers
British Roman Catholics
Dames of Malta
House of Windsor
People from Karlovy Vary
Von Reibnitz family
Wives of British princes
Wives of knights
Society of Women Artists members
British princesses